Club Nocturne (1998) is the 13th studio album (14th overall) from the jazz group Yellowjackets, and their sixth and final release for the Warner Bros. label. The album was nominated for "Best Contemporary Jazz Album" Grammy Award.

The album, originally conceived as an all vocal jazz album, contains four tracks with vocals (five tracks for Japan release), featuring vocalists Kurt Elling, Brenda Russell, and Jonathan Butler. It is also the final album recorded during drummer Will Kennedy's original tenure.

The track "Spirit of the West" remains a staple in the Yellowjackets' live set.

Track listing

Personnel 

Yellowjackets
 Russell Ferrante – keyboards, acoustic piano 
 Jimmy Haslip – bass
 Will Kennedy – drums
 Bob Mintzer – tenor and soprano saxophones

Guest Musicians
 Munyungo Jackson – percussion (5)
 James Harrah – guitar (6)

Guest Vocalists 
 Kurt Elling – vocals (3, 10)
 Jonathan Butler – lead vocals (5), backing vocals (5)
 Richard Page – backing vocals (5)
 Brenda Russell – vocals (6)
 Gino Vannelli – lead vocals (11)

Production 
 Yellowjackets – producers
 Rich Breen – engineer, mixing
 Doug Boehm – assistant engineer
 Troy Gonzalez – assistant engineer
 Steve Harrison – assistant engineer
 Curt Kroeger – assistant engineer
 Jason Mauza - assistant engineer
 David Nottingham – assistant engineer
Jeff Robinette - assistant engineer
 Doug Sax – mastering
 Sally G. Poppe – production coordinator
 Margi Denton (Denton Design Associates) – art direction and design
 Hillary Sunenshine (Denton Design Associates) – art direction and design
 Marina Chavez – photography
 Gary Borman – artist management

Studios 
 Recorded at One on One Studios (North Hollywood, CA); Royaltone Studios (Burbank, CA); Sunset Sound (Hollywood, CA).
 Mixed at The Village (West Los Angeles, CA); Sony Music Studios (Santa Monica, CA).
 Mastered at The Mastering Lab (Hollywood, CA).

References

1997 albums
Yellowjackets albums
Warner Records albums
Instrumental albums